Eurycentrum is a genus of flowering plants from the orchid family, Orchidaceae. It contains 7 known species, native to New Guinea and to certain islands of the Pacific.

Eurycentrum amblyoceras Schltr. - New Guinea 
Eurycentrum atroviride J.J.Sm. - New Guinea 
Eurycentrum fragrans Schltr. - New Guinea 
Eurycentrum goodyeroides Ridl. - New Guinea 
Eurycentrum monticola Schltr. - New Guinea 
Eurycentrum obscurum (Blume) Schltr. in K.M.Schumann & C.A.G.Lauterbach - New Guinea 
Eurycentrum salomonense Schltr. in K.M.Schumann & C.A.G.Lauterbach - Solomons, Vanuatu, Santa Cruz Islands

See also 
 List of Orchidaceae genera

References 

 Pridgeon, A.M., Cribb, P.J., Chase, M.A. & Rasmussen, F. eds. (1999). Genera Orchidacearum 1. Oxford Univ. Press.
 Pridgeon, A.M., Cribb, P.J., Chase, M.A. & Rasmussen, F. eds. (2001). Genera Orchidacearum 2. Oxford Univ. Press.
 Pridgeon, A.M., Cribb, P.J., Chase, M.A. & Rasmussen, F. eds. (2003). Genera Orchidacearum 3. Oxford Univ. Press
 Berg Pana, H. 2005. Handbuch der Orchideen-Namen. Dictionary of Orchid Names. Dizionario dei nomi delle orchidee. Ulmer, Stuttgart

External links 

Cranichideae genera
Goodyerinae